Kate D. Campanale is an American politician from Massachusetts. She was a member of the Massachusetts House of Representatives from 2015-2019. On March 1, 2022, Campanale announced her candidacy for Lieutenant Governor of Massachusetts, losing the primary election to Leah Cole Allen. If she was elected, Campanale would have directly followed Karyn Polito as being the second female former State Representative from Worcester County to be elected as Lieutenant Governor.

Early life 
Campanale was born in Worcester, Massachusetts and is the daughter of John and Debbie Campanale. Her older sister is Jennifer. Campanale grew up in Leicester, Massachusetts, and graduated from Leicester High School.

Education 
In 2007, Campanale earned a Bachelor of Arts degree in Business Management from Sweet Briar College in Sweet Briar, Virginia.

Career 
Campanale began her legislator career as a Staff Assistant to the Legislative & Regulatory  Department of Pension Benefit Guaranty Corporation. She was a Business Development Coordinator at Tutor Perini Corporation, where she worked on multi-million dollar construction proposals.

Campanale is a former legislative aide and a substitute teacher. She served as the District Liaison to Peter Durant, a politician.

On November 4, 2014, at age 28, Campanale won election with 50.2% of the votes and became a Republican member of the Massachusetts House of Representatives for District 17 Worcester, defeating Doug Belanger , who received 49.7% of votes. In January 2015, Campanale was sworn into office. In November 2016, as an incumbent, Campanale won the election and continued serving District 17. She defeated Moses S. Dixon with 54.4% of the votes to Dixon's 45.3%.

In 2018, Campanale sought a seat in Register of Deeds for Worcester District without success. In the Republican Primary Election, she defeated Kevin J. Kuros with 67.4% of the votes. In the General Election, Campanale was defeated by Kathryn A. Toomey with 51.8% of the votes compared to Campanale's 48.2%.

On March 1, 2022, Campanale announced her candidacy for Lieutenant Governor of Massachusetts, running with businessman Chris Doughty of Wrentham, son of conservative William H. Doughty. Campanale would lose the 2022 republican primary to Leah Cole Allen, with Allen carrying 52.3% of the votes to Campanale's 47.7%.

Personal life 
Campanale lived in Leicester, Massachusetts before moving to Spencer, Massachusetts.

Awards 
 Outstanding Service Award. Presented by Office of Policy & External Affairs.
 2018 WBJ 40 Under 40 award. Named by Worcester Business Journal.

See also 
 2016 Massachusetts general election

References

External links 
 Campanale Campaign website
 Katie D. Campanale at malegislature.gov (2015-2018)
 Kate Campanale at ballotpedia.org

21st-century American politicians
21st-century American women politicians
Living people
Republican Party members of the Massachusetts House of Representatives
People from Leicester, Massachusetts
Sweet Briar College alumni
Women state legislators in Massachusetts
Year of birth missing (living people)